Lucius Appuleius Saturninus (died late 100 BC) was a Roman populist and tribune. He is most notable for introducing a series of legislative reforms, alongside his associate Gaius Servilius Glaucia and with the consent of Gaius Marius, during the last years of the second century BC. Senatorial opposition to these laws eventually led to an internal crisis, the declaration of the senatus consultum ultimum, and the deaths of Saturninus, Glaucia, and their followers in 100 BC.

Biography

Quaestor

As quaestor (104 BC), he superintended the imports of grain at Ostia, but was removed by the Roman Senate (an unusual proceeding), and replaced by Marcus Aemilius Scaurus.

First Tribuneship
In 103 BC, he was elected tribune of the plebs. He entered into an agreement with Gaius Marius, and in order to gain the favour of his soldiers proposed that each of his veterans should receive an allotment of 100 iugera of land in the Roman province of Africa. He was also chiefly instrumental in securing the election of Marius to his fourth consulship (102 BC).

An opportunity to retaliate against the Nobiles was afforded him by the arrival (101 BC) of ambassadors from Mithridates VI of Pontus, with large sums of money for bribing the Senate; compromising revelations were made by Saturninus, who insulted the ambassadors. He was brought to trial for violating the law of nations, and only escaped conviction by an ad misericordiam appeal to the people. To the first tribunate of Saturninus is probably to be assigned his law on maiestas, the exact provisions of which are unknown, but its object was probably to strengthen the power of the tribunes and the Populares; it dealt with the minuta majestas (diminished authority) of the Roman people, that is, with all acts tending to impair the integrity of the Commonwealth, being thus more comprehensive than the modern word "treason".

One of the chief objects of Saturninus's hatred was Quintus Caecilius Metellus Numidicus, who, when censor, endeavoured to remove Saturninus from the Senate on the ground of immorality, but his colleague refused to assent. In order to ingratiate himself with the people, who still cherished the memory of the Gracchi, Saturninus took about with him Lucius Equitius, a paid freedman, who made himself out to be the son of Tiberius Sempronius Gracchus. Sempronia, sister of the dead Gracchi, refused to acknowledge her alleged nephew.

Second Tribuneship
Marius, on his return to Rome after his victory over the Cimbri, finding himself isolated in the senate, entered into a compact with Saturninus and his ally Gaius Servilius Glaucia, and the three formed a kind of triumvirate, supported by the veterans of Marius and many of the common people. By the aid of bribery and assassination Marius was elected (100 BC) consul for the sixth time, Glaucia praetor, and Saturninus tribune for the second time. Saturninus now brought forward an agrarian law, the lex Appuleia agraria, an extension of the African law already alluded to. It was proposed that all the land north of the Padus (Po) lately in possession of the Cimbri, including that of the independent Celtic tribes which had been temporarily occupied by them, should be held available for distribution among the veterans of Marius. This was problematic, since the land was already the property of the provincials who had been dispossessed by the Cimbri.

Colonies were to be founded in Sicilia, Achaea, Transalpine Gaul,  and Macedonia, which were to be purchased with the Gold of Tolosa, the temple treasures embezzled by Quintus Servilius Caepio. Further, though they were classed as Roman, Italians were to be admitted to these colonies, and as they were to be burgess colonies, the right of the Italians to equality with the Romans was thereby partially recognized. The city mob therefore strongly opposed the bill, resenting sharing their citizen rights with the Italian allies, and Saturninus was obliged to call up rural voters from outside the city to pass the bill.

A clause provided that, within 5 days after the passing of the law, every senator should take an oath to observe it, under penalty of being expelled from the senate and heavily fined. All the senators subsequently took the oath except Metellus Numidicus, who went into exile. Saturninus also brought in a bill, the object of which was to gain the support of the people by supplying grain at a nominal price. The bill either reduced the already cheap price fixed by the corn-law of Caius Gracchus, or was a repeal of a former Senatorial repeal of Gracchus' law, though the former is more likely. The quaestor Quintus Servilius Caepio the Younger declared that the treasury could not stand the strain, and Saturninus' own colleagues interposed their veto. Saturninus ordered the voting to continue, and Caepio dispersed the meeting by violence. The Senate declared the proceedings null and void, because thunder had been heard; Saturninus replied that the Senate had better remain quiet; otherwise the thunder might be followed by hail. The bills (leges Appuleiae) were finally passed by the aid of the Marian veterans.

Downfall and death
Marius, finding himself overshadowed by his colleagues and compromised by their excesses, thought seriously of breaking with them, and Saturninus and Glaucia saw that their only hope of safety lay in their retention of office. At the elections for 99, held probably in late summer–autumn 100, Saturninus was elected tribune for the third time for the year beginning December 10 100, and Glaucia, although at the time praetor and therefore not eligible until after the lapse of 2 years, was a candidate for the consulship. Marcus Antonius was elected without opposition; the other candidate, Gaius Memmius, who seemed to have the better chance of success, was beaten to death by the hired agents of Saturninus and Glaucia, while the voting was actually going on.

This produced a complete revulsion of public feeling. The Senate met on the following day, declared Saturninus and Glaucia public enemies, and issued the so-called 'final decree' (senatus consultum ultimum) calling upon Marius to defend the State. Marius had no alternative but to obey. Saturninus, defeated in a pitched battle in the Roman Forum, took refuge with his followers in the Capitol, where, the water supply having been cut off, they were forced to capitulate. Marius, having assured them that their lives would be spared, removed them to the Curia Hostilia, intending to proceed against them according to law. But the more impetuous members of the aristocratic party climbed onto the roof, stripped off the tiles, and stoned Saturninus and many others to death. Glaucia, who had escaped into a house, was dragged out and killed.

Descendants
His daughter Appuleia may have married well despite the family disgrace, and was perhaps the mother of two consuls, including the triumvir Marcus Aemilius Lepidus.

Cultural depictions
The historical novels The First Man in Rome and The Grass Crown, by Colleen McCullough, largely focus on the rise and fall of Gaius Marius and his lengthy career. Lucius Appuleius Saturninus is a secondary character with his own plot line in the first novel. Several sections are written from Saturninus' point of view.

References

Citations

Bibliography

 Appian, Bell. civ. i. 28–33
 Diod. Sic. xxxvi 12
 Plutarch, Marius, 28–30
 Livy, Epit. 69
 Florus iii. 16
 Velleius Paterculus ii. 12
 Auctor ad Herennium i. 21
 Aurelius Victor, De viris illustribus, 73
 Orosius v. 17
 Cicero, Pro Balbo, 21, 48, Brutus, 62, De oratore, ii. 49, De haruspicum responsis, 19, Pro Sestio, Pro Rabirio, passim
 Mommsen, Hist. of Rome (Eng. trans.), bk. iv. ch. 6
 G. Long, Decline of the Roman Republic, ii. ch. 10
 E. Klebs in Pauly-Wissowa's Realencyclopädie, ii. 1 (1896)

2nd-century BC births
100 BC deaths
2nd-century BC Romans
1st-century BC Romans
Saturninus, Lucius
Assassinated Roman politicians
Deaths by stoning
Populares
Roman quaestors
Senators of the Roman Republic
Tribunes of the plebs